Tottori 1st district is a constituency of the House of Representatives in the Diet of Japan. It covers roughly the Eastern half of Tottori and consists of the cities of Tottori and Kurayoshi and the districts of Iwami, Yazu and the town of Misasa in Tōhaku District. In 2012, 256,020 eligible voters were registered in the district. In 2013 the town of Yurihama was transferred to the 2nd district. Before the 2021 elections, the district had 230,959 eligible voters, fewer than in any other single member electoral district.

Before the electoral reform of 1994, the area had been part of Tottori At-large district where four Representatives had been elected by single non-transferable vote.

Tottori 1st district, like most of Chūgoku, usually votes for conservative candidates. The district is a "conservative kingdom" (保守王国, hoshu ōkoku), a stronghold of the Liberal Democratic Party, and its only representative since its creation has been Shigeru Ishiba (without faction, formerly Nukaga faction), secretary-general, former defense and agriculture minister, son of former Councillor and Tottori governor Jirō Ishiba and grandson of Tarō Kanamori, (appointed) governor of Tokushima and Yamagata in the 1930s.

List of representatives

Election results

References 

Districts of the House of Representatives (Japan)